Phaeoptyx is a genus of cardinalfishes native to the western Atlantic Ocean.

Species
The recognized species in this genus are:
 Phaeoptyx conklini (Silvester, 1915) (freckled cardinalfish)
 Phaeoptyx pigmentaria (Poey, 1860) (dusky cardinalfish)
 Phaeoptyx xenus (J. E. Böhlke & J. E. Randall, 1968) (sponge cardinalfish)

References

Apogoninae
Marine fish genera
Taxa named by Thomas H. Fraser